Keerthi Pandian (born 18 February 1992) is an Indian actress who predominantly works in Tamil cinema and theatre. She made her debut in 2019 in the adventure film Thumbaa in the direction of Harish Ram. She then garnered critical acclaim for her performance in the survival thriller film Anbirkiniyal directed by Gokul. She is also the daughter of actor and politician Arun Pandian and the cousin of actress Ramya Pandian. She is also known for acting in a variety of successful films such as Thumbaa (2019) and Anbirkiniyal (2021). Keerthi Pandian won the Super daughter award by Femina after her appearance as the lead actress in Thumbaa.

Early life 
Keerthi Pandian was born on 18 February 1992 in Chennai in the state of Tamil Nadu to actor and politician Arun Pandian, and his wife Vijaya Pandian. She has two elder sisters named Kavitha Pandian and Kirana Pandian, and a cousin Ramya Pandian, who is also an actress. Keerthi did her schooling at Chettinad Vidyashram in Chennai where she also graduated from.

Career

2015–2018 
After graduating, Pandian began her career as a dancer in ballet and salsa, then shifted to theatre acting in 2015. She was also the head director of operations in A&P Groups, a film distribution company owned by her father, while simultaneously running her own distribution company in Singapore. Pandian initially did not receive many film offers by directors at the start of her appearance in the industry due to discrimination towards her skin color and her being underweight. She even declined others because she felt she did not have meaty roles in them; during auditions, she always introduced herself simply by her first name to avoid the appearance of nepotism as Arun Pandian's daughter.

2019–present 
Pandian was approached by director Harish Ram offering her a lead role in the film Thumbaa (2019); she accepted, making her debut film as an actress in Tamil cinema. Pandian later acted in Anbirkiniyal (2021), a remake of the Malayalam film Helen (2019), as the main character alongside her father. Anbirkiniyal was featured as one of the best south Indian thriller films out there by Telangana Today, calling Keerthi Pandian's acting skills in the film fabulous and unique giving it a positive critic overall. She also acted in the comedy series Postman alongside Munishkanth which was released on ZEE5. Pandian also won the Super daughter award by Femina which was awarded to her by her father in 2019 after her debut film appearance in Thumbaa. Keerthi's upcoming films include Konjam Pesinaal Yenna and Kannagi.

Personal life
Pandian's niece Driya portrayed the younger version of her character in Anbirkiniyal. In early 2020 during the first COVID-19 lockdown in India period, Pandian developed an interest in farming and helping crops grow for better produce in the future in her gated property.

Filmography

Films

Television

Awards and nominations

References

External links 

 Official site

1992 births
21st-century Indian actresses
Actresses in Tamil cinema
Indian film actresses
Living people
Salsa dancers
Tamil actresses